Raja Muthirai is a 1995 Tamil language film directed by R. K. Selvamani. The film stars Arun Pandian and Roja whilst Raghuvaran, Napoleon and Silk Smitha play supporting roles. It was released on 15 February 1995.

Plot

Cast 
Arun Pandian as Rajkumar
Napoleon as Markandeyan
Roja as Priya
Vineetha as Abirami
Sukumari
C. R. Saraswathi as Sathyabama Mami
Raghuvaran as Usman
Mansoor Ali Khan as Poli Samiyar
M. N. Nambiar
Major Sundarrajan
V. K. Ramasamy as Bai
Silk Smitha

Soundtrack 
"Mainave Mainave"
"Yaaru Rambavai"

Reception 
Pa. Raghavan of Kalki praised Panneerselvam's cinematography as the film's positive.

References

External links 
 

1990s Tamil-language films
1995 action films
1995 films
Films directed by R. K. Selvamani
Films scored by Ilaiyaraaja
Indian action films